Dipterocarpus nudus is a tree in the family Dipterocarpaceae.

Description
The crown is dark and dense.

Distribution and habitat
Dipterocarpus nudus is endemic to Borneo. It is found in a variety of habitats, up to  altitude.

References

nudus
Endemic flora of Borneo
Trees of Borneo
Plants described in 1874
Flora of the Borneo lowland rain forests